Brighton School may refer to:

Brighton Schools
Brighton School (filmmaking), a loosely associated group of filmmakers active in the Brighton and Hove area of England 1896-1910
Brighton School (Sacramento, California), a property on the National Register of Historic Places
Brighton School (Lynnwood, Washington), a private K-8 school
Brighton School (Toronto)

Schools of Brighton
 Brighton Area Schools, Brighton, Metro Detroit, Michigan, USA
 Brighton Central School District, Monroe County, New York State, USA
 List of schools in Brighton and Hove, East Sussex, England, UK
 List of former board schools in Brighton and Hove

See also
 Brighton Grammar School, Brighton, Melbourne, Victoria, Australia
 Brighton Business School, University of Brighton, Brighton, Sussex, England, UK
 Brighton and Sussex Medical School, Brighton, Sussex, England, UK

 Brighton High School (disambiguation)
 Brighton College (disambiguation)
 Brighton (disambiguation)